Pont-la-Ville is a commune in the Haute-Marne department in north-eastern France.

Geography
The village lies on the left bank of the Aujon, which flows northward through the eastern part of the commune.

See also
Communes of the Haute-Marne department

References

Pontlaville